Self-Portrait at a Spinet is a c.1555 oil on canvas painting by Sofonisba Anguissola, now in the National Museum of Capodimonte in Naples.

It was in cardinal Fulvio Orsini's collection, which passed to Odoardo Farnese in 1600. Orsini's collection also included Anguissola's Partita and two drawings by her.

Bibliography
I Campi: cultura artistica cremonese del Cinquecento, Milano, Electa, 1985, SBN IT\ICCU\PAL\0002579. A cura di Mina Gregori.
Flavio Caroli, Sofonisba Anguissola e le sue sorelle, Milano, A. Mondadori, 1987, SBN IT\ICCU\CFI\0111864.
AA VV, Sofonisba Anguissola e le sue sorelle, Milano, Leonardo arte, 1994, SBN IT\ICCU\VEA\0063954. Catalogo della mostra tenuta a Cremona nel 1994, a Vienna e a Washington nel 1995.

See also
 List of paintings by Sofonisba Anguissola

1555 paintings
Self
Self-portraits
Paintings in the collection of the Museo di Capodimonte
Farnese Collection